Fanning Springs State Park is a Florida State Park, located on US 19/98 in the town of Fanning Springs. It contains one of the state's 33 first magnitude springs.  As of 2008, decreased water emission levels at the springs technically requalify the first magnitude status as "historical first magnitude."

The original occupants of the land were native aborigines, "paleo-Indian people", beginning 14,000 years ago, and several of sites previously occupied by them have been located within the park.

The area has been used for recreation, and in 1993 the state acquired the park. The Florida Department of Environmental Protection took over care of the park in 1997.

The Nature Coast State Trail, which follows abandoned railway lines, has a junction at Fanning Springs near the state park.

References

External links
 Fanning Springs State Park at Florida State Parks
 Fanning Springs State Park at State Parks
 Fanning Springs State Park at Wildernet

State parks of Florida
Parks in Levy County, Florida
Springs of Florida
Bodies of water of Levy County, Florida
1993 establishments in Florida